The National Bank of Canada is the sixth largest commercial bank in Canada. It is headquartered in Montreal, and has branches in most Canadian provinces and 2.4 million personal clients. National Bank is the largest bank in Quebec, and the second largest financial institution in the province, after Desjardins credit union. National Bank's Institution Number is 006 and its SWIFT code is BNDCCAMMINT.

History

In 1859, francophone businessmen in Ontario and Quebec were keen to establish a bank under their local control, and persuade the provincial legislature to pass the act that created the Banque Nationale on May 4, 1859.  Some members of the anglophone bourgeoisie participated in the bank's share capital, but francophones retained exclusive control and held all seats on the board of directors with Ulric-Joseph Tessier, lawyer and Member of the Legislative Assembly serving as chairman of the bank.

The bank suffered losses during the banking crisis sparked by the financial panic of 1873 and panic of 1884 but managed to survive and continued to operate.  In the 1930s, during the Great Depression, Banque Nationale again came under financial stress; this time a merger was arranged with Banque d’Hochelaga assisted by the province's legislature to strengthen the bank. The merged bank was renamed "Banque Canadienne Nationale" (BCN) (English, "Canadian National Bank").

In 1968, BCN, in conjunction with a number of other banks, launched Chargex, the first credit card to be issued by a Canadian bank.

During the 1970s, Quebec-based rival Provincial Bank of Canada expanded rapidly through a number of acquisitions. It merged with the People's Bank in 1970, with the Toronto-based Unity Bank of Canada, and in 1979 it acquired Laurentide Financial Corporation of Vancouver. Provincial Bank and BCN continued to expand but continued to have a large part of their operations concentrated in Quebec. In November 1979, these two banks decided to merge under the new name "National Bank of Canada" in what was at the time one of the largest bank mergers.

Post-merger
Through the 1980s the bank continued to grow and expand its businesses through a number of acquisitions, including the brokerage firm Lévesque Beaubien and a year later Geoffrion Leclerc, which became known as Lévesque Beaubien Geoffrion.  In 1993, it sold its lease financing operations to GE Capital and acquired the assets of General Trust of Canada.

In 1994, it made a small step outside Canada when it opened two branches in the United States, one in Florida and one in California. As of 2020, its Natbank subsidiary has three branches, all in Florida. In 1995 the bank opened a representative office in Cuba to assist Canadian clients doing business in the country. In 1999 it concluded its purchase of First Marathon, a Toronto-based brokerage firm. First Marathon and the Bank's subsidiary Lévesque Beaubien Geoffrion Inc. merged their operations to form National Bank Financial (NBF), its investment banking subsidiary. In 2002 it acquired US-based investment bank Putnam Lovell and merged the operations with its NBF subsidiary which started operating through offices in New York, Toronto, and London.

In March 2006, it sold its shareholder management services to Computershare.

In 2016, it acquired 90 percent of the shares of ABA Bank of Cambodia (formerly known as the Advanced Bank of Asia). In 2019, it acquired the remaining 10 percent that had been held by a former head of the Kazakhstan Stock Exchange, Damir Karassayev.

In October 2019, National Bank of Canada was criticized by privacy experts for requiring new online customers to provide their full login credentials for accounts with other financial institutions, including password. On its website, the bank tells clients to "Never tell anyone your password", yet during the process of creating an account, they say, "... you will need to provide... your login credentials with another eligible Canadian financial institution".

Operations
In August 2021, National Bank brokerage became the second Canadian financial institution to offer free online direct brokerage after Wealthsimple introduced it first.

On October 31, 2019, National Bank had a network of 422 branches and 939 automated teller machines in Canada. It also had a representative offices, subsidiaries and partnerships in other countries, through which it serves Canadian and non-Canadian clients. It owns ABA Bank in Cambodia.

National Bank's business is concentrated in Quebec, and it is expanding in other provinces. For the year ending October 31, 2017, 59% of its total revenues were from Quebec, 30% from other provinces, and 11% from its international operations. Its total revenue for the year were allocated across business segments:
 44.8% from Personal and Commercial Banking,
 23.5% from Wealth Management,
 23.8% from Financial Markets, and
 7.9% from U.S. Specialty Finance and International.

In 2011, National Bank was placed third in Bloomberg's list of "The World’s Strongest Banks". in 2018, it placed 41st on Go back Finance's list of the 50 strongest banks.

Management
The management structure of the bank consists of an office of the President and a board of directors.

See also

 Big Five (banks)
 List of banks and credit unions in Canada
 List of banks in the Americas

Notes

References

External links

 Official website
 Natbank
 National Bank Direct Brokerage inc.
 National Bank Financial
 National Bank Insurance

 
Companies listed on the Toronto Stock Exchange
Banks of Canada
Canadian brands
S&P/TSX 60
Companies based in Montreal
Insurance companies of Canada
Banks established in 1859